was the founder of Shorei-kan karate.

Biography
As a young boy, Toguchi learned the basic techniques of Okinawan Te from his father. In 1930, at the age of 15, he began his lifelong study of Gōjū-ryū karate at the dojo of Sekō Higa and later under Chojun Miyagi as one of his principal students. He studied under Higa for over 33 years and under Miyagi for more than 25 years, making his karate education unique. Toguchi was fortunate as Miyagi was a personal friend of Toguchi's father and so paid many visits to the family. At these times the conversation nearly always turned to karate and the discussions would go on till the early hours of the morning.

Toguchi continued his full-time study of karate until the beginning of World War II, when he was drafted into the army as an electrical engineer and stationed in Sumatra, Indonesia. In 1946 he returned to Okinawa to find a devastated people and homeland. Miyagi had lost three children and one of his senior students, Jinan Shinsato. Higa had lost his wife. Miyagi began teaching at the police academy and Higa moved in with Toguchi. At this time Higa also played matchmaker and introduced Toguchi to a young girl named Haruko, soon to be his wife.

In 1949, with the help of Toguchi, Higa opened up a new dojo and Toguchi was appointed Shihan. Before his death, Miyagi passed on all his advanced kata and teachings to Toguchi, one of the more important being kaisai no genri. This teaching explains how to unlock the hidden techniques of the koryu kata. In 1953, after the death of Miyagi, his senior students formed the Karate-Do Goju Association with Meitoku Yagi as chairman and Seikichi Toguchi as Vice Chairman.

Establishment of Shorei-kan 

In 1954 Toguchi opened up the first Shorei-kan dojo (House of politeness and respect) in Koza City, Okinawa. The Shorei-kan dojo was very close to the American military base (Kadena Air Base) and the Americans showed a great interest in the martial arts. With an increasing western population in his dojo, Toguchi found it necessary to devise a progressive teaching method to overcome the language barrier. Expanding on Miyagi's vision, Toguchi further developed a system of progressive kata and added bunkai and kiso kumite to help explain application of the kata. Many of the early pioneers of Okinawan karate in the US studied with Toguchi.

In 1956 the Okinawan Karate-Do Federation was formed and Toguchi was installed as a member of the board of directors. By 1960 Toguchi decided to move to mainland Japan to spread the art of karate and Shorei-kan. During the coming years he would move between Okinawa in the winter and Tokyo in the summer. He first practiced outdoors at the Hikawa Shrine where he developed the kata Hakutsuru No Mai. In 1962 the first Shorei-kan dojo was opened in Tokyo in Meguro Borough and in 1966 Shorei-kan Hombu Dojo Tokyo was built with the help of Tamano Construction (founded by Toshio Tamano's father).

Although there were Shorei-kan students and instructors already in the US, such as Jay Trombley in Texas, Shoichi Yamamoto of the University of Kansas and John Roseberry in Nebraska, Toguchi sent Ichiro Takahata to the US in 1968 as the representative of Shorei-kan and to establish a USA headquarters. Robert L Willingham and Bill Mays were of great assistance in helping the Oklahoma Shoreikan Goju Ryu style become established in Oklahoma and the region.

In 1969 Akira Kawakami travelled to New York City and joined Thomas Bodie at his uptown dojo and later moved to Oklahoma. That same year Toshio Tamano also came to New York City and it was decided then that the USA headquarters would be established with him in New York. Kow Loon Ong was instrumental in helping the headquarters get started.    In 1972 Toguchi sent Tomoaki Koyabu to Canada to teach Shoreikan. Over the following years Toguchi and his wife Haruko Toguchi traveled numerous times to both Canada and the US. Later on Tamano moved to Milan, Italy to spread Shorei-kan throughout Europe and Scott Lenzi is now the representative of the U.S. and South America. Vic Hargitt is the representative for Canada. Haribabu represents Asia and Vahitha Haribabu represents India.

Vic Hargitt was the last person to receive the Shihan title from Toguchi in June 1997 and was also the last person to be given certification by a member of the Toguchi family.  This was for the rank of Rokudan, July 2004.

Death
Toguchi died at the age of 81. He was the last living Okinawan to receive the title of bushi, a title also held by his teacher, Chojun Miyagi.

Bibliography 

Seikichi Toguchi has written two books:

Okinawan Goju-Ryu: Fundamentals of Shorei-Kan Karate
Okinawan Goju-Ryu II: Advanced Techniques of Shorei-Kan Karate

References 

1917 births
1998 deaths
Martial arts school founders
Martial arts writers
Okinawan male karateka
Gōjū-ryū practitioners
20th-century philanthropists